John McEnroe was the defending champion, but did not participate this year.

Marc Rosset won the title, beating Mats Wilander 6–3, 6–2 in the final.

Seeds

  Aaron Krickstein (quarterfinals)
  Guy Forget (first round)
  Jonas Svensson (quarterfinals)
  Ronald Agénor (quarterfinals)
  Andrei Cherkasov (first round)
  Marc Rosset (champion)
  Yannick Noah (second round)
  Jean-Philippe Fleurian (first round)

Draw

Finals

Top half

Bottom half

References

 Main Draw

Grand Prix de Tennis de Lyon